Orchid for the Afterworld is the second studio album by Australian dance and techno musical group Sonic Animation. The album was released in October 1999 and peaked at number 42 on The Australian ARIA Charts. The album was certified gold in Australia in 2005.

At the ARIA Music Awards of 2000 the album was nominated for two awards; ARIA Award for Breakthrough Artist – Album and ARIA Award for Best Dance Release.

Track listing

all vocal by Rupert Keiller, unless noted.

Charts

Certifications

Release history

References

1999 albums